Southwark Bridge is an arch bridge in London, for traffic linking the district of Southwark and the City across the River Thames. Besides when others are closed for temporary repairs, it has the least traffic of the Thames bridges in London.

History

A previous bridge, designed by John Rennie the Elder, opened on the site in 1819. On the 1818 Cary map of London, it was labelled as Queen Street Bridge. All subsequent maps label it as Southwark Bridge.  The bridge consisted of three large cast-iron spans supported by granite piers. The bridge was notable for having the longest cast iron span, ever made. Unsurprisingly, it became known colloquially as "The Iron Bridge" as mentioned inter alia in Charles Dickens' "Little Dorrit". The iron spans were cast in Masborough, Rotherham. It was a commercial tolled operation which was trying to compete with the toll free Blackfriars and London bridges nearby, but the company became bankrupt and its interests were acquired by the Bridge House Estates which then made it toll free in 1864.

A new bridge on the site was designed by Ernest George and Basil Mott. It was built by Sir William Arrol & Co. and opened on 6 June 1921.

Halfway along the bridge on the Western side is a plaque which is inscribed:
 Re-built by the Bridge House Estates Committee
 of the Corporation of London
 1913-1921
 Opened for traffic by their Majesties
 King George V and Queen Mary
 6th June 1921
 Sir Ernest Lamb CMG, JP Chairman
 Basil Mott, CB Engineer
 Sir Ernest George RA Architect

The bridge provides access to Upper Thames Street on the north bank and, due to the ring of steel, there is no further road access to the City and the north. The bridge is owned and maintained by Bridge House Estates, a charitable trust overseen by the City of London Corporation. The current bridge was given Grade II listed structure status in 1995.

Nearby

At the north-west side is Vintners’ Court, a 1990s office block which has a classical façade of columns and pediment; this was developed on the site owned by the Worshipful Company of Vintners whose hall is behind it on Upper Thames Street.

The south end is near the Tate Modern, the Clink Prison Museum, the Globe Theatre, and the Financial Times and Ofcom buildings. Below the bridge on the south side are some old steps, which were once used by Thames watermen as a place to moor their boats and wait for customers.

Below the bridge on the south side is a pedestrian tunnel, part of the Queen's Walk Embankment, containing a frieze depicting the Thames frost fairs.

Cycle Superhighway 7 runs along the bridge.

Popular culture
Southwark Bridge appears in many films, including Harry Potter and the Order of the Phoenix (2007).
The cream painted houses on the south side of the bridge, Anchor Terrace, just after the FT building, were used for the exterior shots of the shared house in This Life.
The 1819-1920 "Iron Bridge" is mentioned in the first sentence of "Our Mutual Friend" by Charles Dickens, and several times in his "Little Dorrit", where in Chapter 24 he identifies the toll as being one penny.
In the 1964 Disney film Mary Poppins, the Banks family mistakenly think that George W. Banks has committed suicide by jumping off the bridge after he is fired from his job at the bank.
DCI Luther and Alice Morgan meet at Southwark Bridge in the season 3 finale of the BBC crime drama Luther.
The bridge appears in the final scene of Lock, Stock and Two Smoking Barrels with Tom leaning over the bridge with his cell phone in his mouth set to drop antique guns in the Thames River.

See also
List of crossings of the River Thames
List of bridges in London

References

External links
 
 

Bridges completed in 1819
Rebuilt buildings and structures in the United Kingdom
Bridges completed in 1921
Bridges across the River Thames
Grade II listed bridges in London
Transport in the London Borough of Southwark
Bridges in the City of London
Former toll bridges in England
Grade II listed buildings in the City of London
Grade II listed buildings in the London Borough of Southwark
Bridges in London
Bridge light displays